Sporting Club de Bruxelles was an ephemeric football club in Belgium that existed only for three years.  It was founded in 1894 as Ixelles Sporting Club but the name was changed to Sporting Club de Bruxelles before the first Belgian Championship was held in 1895–96.  The club finished 3rd behind F.C. Liégeois and Antwerp FC.  However, the club withdrew during the next season and was dissolved.

Colours

The team's home colours were blue and black.

Stadium

1894 : Cinquantenaire Park, Brussels
1896 : Leopold Park, Brussels
1897 : Tir national, Schaerbeek
1897 : rue Dailly à Schaerbeek

Anecdotes
On 10 January 1897, the team lost 18 – 0 against Racing Club de Bruxelles.
This result is the biggest gap between two teams in the Belgian Domestic League.

References
Belgian football clubs history
RSSSF Archive

Association football clubs established in 1894
Sporting Club
Association football clubs disestablished in 1897
1894 establishments in Belgium
1897 disestablishments in Belgium
Defunct football clubs in Belgium
Belgian Pro League clubs